Eric Laurence Needham (7 June 1913 – 8 May 2000) was an Australian rules footballer who played with St Kilda in the Victorian Football League (VFL).

Notes

External links 

1913 births
2000 deaths
VFL/AFL players born in England
Australian rules footballers from Victoria (Australia)
St Kilda Football Club players
Caulfield Football Club players
English emigrants to Australia